Tola Mankiewiczówna (8 May 1900 – 27 October 1985) was a Polish singer and actress. She has recorded albums for such labels as: Columbia, Syrena and Estar. During the war, these recordings were lost and Mankiewiczówna never regained them.

Selected filmography
 Co mój mąż robi w nocy (1934)
 Parade of the Reservists (1934)

References

External links

1900 births
1985 deaths
Polish film actresses
Polish sopranos
20th-century Polish actresses
Polish cabaret performers
20th-century Polish women singers
20th-century comedians
Artists from Białystok